K. A. Beena (കെ.എ.ബീന) is an Indian author, journalist and columnist who writes in Malayalam. She started her career as a journalist for Kerala Kaumudi publications and later worked for Mathrubhumi Publications. In 1991, she joined the Indian Information Service, for the government of India. She has published 34 books including travelogues, short story collections, novels for children, collection of essays, memoirs and media-related books. In 2014 and 2016, Beena received the regional and national Laadli Media Award.She received V.K. Madhavan kutty journalism award in 2016.  Along with her written works, Beena regularly contributes columns in leading publications.

Early life and family 
She was born in Vazhayila, Trivandrum district of Kerala, as the daughter of M. Karunakaran Nair and Ambika Nair. She has a master's degree in journalism and English literature from University of Kerala. Her husband, Baiju Chandran, is the deputy director of Doordarshan, New Delhi.

Career 
Beena started writing in her early school days. Beena's first book Beena Kanda Russia, a travelogue, was written at the age of 13. The book recounts her experiences of attending the International Children's camp at Artek, in the Ukrainian SSR, in 1977. In 1987, she became the assistant editor for the Kerala Kaumudi women's magazine and moved to the Gruhalekshmi Mathrubhumy Group of Publications in 1989. In 1991, she joined the Indian Information Service for the Government of India and has worked as the news editor of All India Radio and Doordarshan. She also worked in the Press Information Bureau and Directorate of Advertisement and Visual Publicity.   

Beena is a regular columnist in many Malayalam publications. Her columns in the Kerala Kaumudi daily Adayalangal, the Mathrubhumi online Akakazcha, the Manorama online Vakkukalkappuram and the Deshabhimani weekly Vazhivilakku were widely acclaimed. She has also contributed columns to the Deshabhimani daily, Malayalam news, Vanitha, Kanyaka. During the last 35 years, there have been numerous editions of Beena Kanda Russia. In 2015, it was republished. 

Her other noted work Brahmaputhrayile veedu is of her travel experiences in the North East. Chuvadukal and Nadi Thinnunna Dweep are also here widely accepted travelogues. She travels to Indian villages and writes about the rural settings in many magazines. Presently working as assistant director, Central Bureau of Communication, Ernakulam. 

Her book on the legendary writer Vaikom Muhammed Basheer, Basheer Enna Anugraham, is a memoir and tribute to the writer. The book reveals an unusual friendship between them. Beena's novels for children, Ammakkuttiyude Lokam and Ammakkuttiyude School are widely read. Perumazhayath is her nostalgic memories of her friends. Sheethanidra and Kaumaram Kadannu Varunnathu are short story collections. Radio Kathayum Kalayum is the book on the history of radio broadcasting in Malayalam. Date line – Charithathe Chirakilettiyavar is the life sketches of 17 veteran journalists of Kerala.

Bibliography

Travelogues 
Beena Kanda Russia, Brahmaputhrayile Veedu, Chuvadukal, Nadi Thinnunna Dweep

Short stories 
Kaumaram Kadannu Varunnathu, Sheethanidra. Kadhakal

Children's literature 
Ammakkuttiyude Lokam, Ammakkuttiyude School, Ammkkuttiyude Athbhuthangal, Madhyamangalkku Parayanullathu, Panchathanthram, Miliyude Aaakasham, The Reporter,Rosum Koottukarum

Memoirs 
Basheer Enna Anugraham, Basheerinte Kathukal, Perumazhayath, Athirthiyude Athiru, Kuttikkalam

Media 
Radio Kathayum Kalayum, Dateline – Charithrathe Chirakilettiyuavar, Varthakal Report Cheyyunathu, Pathra Jeevithangal, Radio(HandBook)

Collection of essays 
Bhoothakkannadi, Ammamar Ariyathathu, Kadannal,Ethanu Sanittari Padinte Anthima Rahasyam

Awards 
Laadli Media Award 2014 and 2016 (online and print), Regional and National Awards instituted by United Nations Population Fund and Population First, Mumbai.
V.K. Madhavankutty award for print media, 2016
Sheela Teacher award for socially committed journalism work, 2019
Akashavani National Awards for best script, 2010
Rajalekshmy Award for literary contribution, 2015

References

External links 
 
 
 
 

Indian women journalists
Living people
Women writers from Kerala
Writers from Thiruvananthapuram
Indian women columnists
Indian columnists
Malayalam-language writers
20th-century Indian journalists
20th-century Indian women writers
21st-century Indian women writers
21st-century Indian writers
21st-century Indian journalists
Journalists from Kerala
1964 births